Transhealth, Inc. is an American independent and comprehensive trans healthcare center that services trans and gender-diverse adults, children, and families. Transhealth was founded in Western Massachusetts in 2021 to provide clinical care, research, advocacy, and education related to gender-affirming healthcare.

History

Needs assessment 
The PATH Project (Plan and Act for Transgender Health)], a needs assessment conducted as a partnership between local gender-diverse community members and staff from The Fenway Institute, Cooley Dickinson Health Care, and Harvard Medical School, was designed to inform the creation of Transhealth.

Founding 
Transhealth was incorporated in Massachusetts on October 16, 2020. At the time, the organization incorporated with Dallas Ducar NP as the President, Katie Wolf as the Treasurer and Clerk, and a Board consisting of Perry Cohen, Lauren Meade MD, and Adrian Daul MD. At this time, Dallas Ducar was elected to the position of Chief Executive Officer and Katie Wolf was hired as Chief Operating Officer.

Transhealth opened on May 4, 2021.The healthcare center began by providing care for trans and gender-diverse people of all ages in Western Massachusetts clinical services including: primary adult care, pediatric care, gender-affirming hormonal care, and mental healthcare. A range of non-clinical services were also in the vision to support the community, research, education, and advocacy. These pillars of clinical care, research, education, and advocacy were advanced through local partnerships, educating students, collaboration with policy advocates, and expanding patient care.

Clinical care 
Transhealth is attempting to serve the needs of the estimated 20,000 trans and gender-diverse individuals across different parts of New England. Transhealth currently serves 1,200 patients. Now, Transhealth is a member of the New England Gender C.A.R.E Consortium.

Advocacy 
Transhealth advanced policy change by commenting on moves by the federal and state government. Transhealth advocates for the need for increased healthcare access through telehealth and interstate licensure, and expanding reimbursement and incentives for gender-affirming care. Transhealth is a member of the National LGBTQI Health Roundtable.

Education 
Transhealth is involved in educational initiatives across Western Massachusetts. Brooke Stott, one of the researchers on the PATH Study, also began working on educational initiatives with local partners. Aleah Nesteby, a local nurse practitioner, joined Transhealth Northampton in the fall of 2021 to educate clinicians and also focus on educating the general public about working with the LGBTQ community.

Research 
Transhealth has assisted in the development of the Endocrine Nurses Society Position Statement on Transgender and Gender Diverse Care. Transhealth plans to continue community-based participatory research once the organization has developed an Institutional Review Board.

References

External links 

 Official web site

Medical and health organizations based in Massachusetts
Transgender and medicine
2021 establishments in Massachusetts
501(c)(3) organizations
Medical research organizations